Stooke is a surname. Notable people with the surname include:

 Elliott Stooke (born 1993), English rugby union player
 George F. Stooke (1867–1907), English physician and medical missionary
 Nathan Stooke (born 1976), American swimmer
 Wally Stooke (1895–1962), Australian rules football player, coach, and administrator